The following is a list of literary depictions of and related to the 1813 novel Pride and Prejudice by Jane Austen. As 100 protagonist-focused sequels were noted in 2013
 and many more titles have been published since then, it is limited to entries at least mentioned by a notable source.

Literature

Works by Alexa Adams 
 First Impressions (2010)
 "And Who Can Be In Doubt Of What Followed?" (2013)
 Holidays at Pemberley or Third Encounters (2013)
 Jane & Bingley: Something Slightly Unsettling (2013)
 Second Glances (2013)
 The Madness of Mr. Darcy (2014)
 Darcy in Wonderland (2017)
 I am Lady Catherine (2017)
 Mr. Darcy's Christmas Present: The Madness of Mr. Darcy Continues (2017)
 Being Mrs. Bennet (2018)
 Young Wickham (2018)

Works by Pamela Aidan
 An Assembly Such as This (2006)
 Duty and Desire (2006)
 These Three Remain (2007)
 Young Master Darcy – A Lesson in Honour (2010)

Works by Karen Aminadra 
 Charlotte (2012)
 Rosings (2013)
 Wickham (2014)
 Christmas at Longbourn (2017)
 Miss Darcy's Christmas (2018)

Works by Elizabeth Aston
 Mr. Darcy's Daughters (2003)
 The Exploits & Adventures of Miss Alethea Darcy (2005)
 The True Darcy Spirit (2006)
 The Second Mrs. Darcy (2007)
 The Darcy Connection (2008)
 Mr. Darcy's Dream (2009)

Works by Janet Aylmer
 Darcy's Story (UK 1996, US 2006)
 The New Illustrated Darcy's Story (1999)
 Dialogue with Darcy (2010)
 The Complete Dialogue with Darcy (2013)

Works by Jo Baker 
 Longbourn (2013)

Works by Carrie Bebris
 Pride and Prescience: or, A Truth Universally Acknowledged (2004)
 Suspense and Sensibility: or, First Impressions Revisited (2005)
 North By Northanger: or, The Shades of Pemberley (2006)
 The Matters of Mansfield: or, The Crawford Affair (2008)
 The Intrigue at Highbury: or, Emma's Match (2010)
 The Deception at Lyme: or, The Peril of Persuasion (2011)
 The Suspicion at Sanditon: or, The Disappearance of Lady Denham (2015)

Works by Jennifer Becton 
 Charlotte Collins (2010)
 Maria Lucas (2010)
 Caroline Bingley (2011)
 Mary Bennet (2014)
 Live, Love, Longbourn (2020)

Works by Linda Berdoll 
 The Bar Sinister (1999)
 Mr. Darcy Takes a Wife (2004)
 Darcy & Elizabeth: Nights and Days at Pemberley (2006)
 The Darcys: The Ruling Passion (2011)
 The Darcys: New Pleasures (2016)

Works by Diana Birchall 
 Mrs. Darcy's Dilemma (2008)

Works by Cheryl Bolen 
 Miss Darcy's New Companion (2016)
 Miss Darcy's Secret Love (2016)
 The Liberation of Miss de Bourgh (2016)

Works by D. A. Bonavia-Hunt 
 Pemberley Shades (1949)

Works by Bella Breen
 Pride and Prejudice and Poison (2018)
 Pride and Prejudice and Secrets (2018)
 Forced to Marry (2018)
 The Rescue of Elizabeth Bennet (2019)
 Love Unmasked (2019)
 Mr. Darcy Goes to Brighton (2019)
 Four Months to Wed (2019)
 Pride and Prejudice Variations 7 Books (2020)

Works by Sybil G. Brinton
 Old Friends and New Fancies (1913) (the first sequel to Jane Austen's novels, also including characters from all other five novels)

Works by Mark Brownlow 
 Cake and Courtship (2017)
 The Lovesick Maid (2018)
 The Darcy Ring (2018)

Works by Diane Bryton 
 The Spy's Engagement (2017)
 Murder at Netherfield (2017)
 Tides of the Heart (2017)
 Marriage by Decree (2018)

Works by Erin Butler 
 Fates Entwined (2017)
 Pride's Remedy (2017)
 Chaos & Courtship (2017)
 Courting Mr. Darcy (2017)
 To Live and Love (2017)
 Mayhem & Muslin (2017)
 A Fine Line (2017)
 Accidental Affection (2017)

Works by Christie Capps 
 Mr. Darcy's Bad Day (2017)
 For Pemberley (2017)
 The Perfect Gift (2017)
 A Forever Kind of Love (2017)
 Elizabeth (2018)
 Lost & Found (2018)

Works by Sophia Carlson 
 A Husband for Elizabeth (2018)

Works by Caitlin Marie Carrington 
 Darcy and Elizabeth's First Night (2017)
 Mr. Darcy's Secret Desires (2017)
 Mr. Darcy's Perfect Storm (2017)
 Saved from Scandal (2017)
 Snowbound with Darcy (2018)
 Darcy and Diamonds (2018)
 My Alpha, Mr. Darcy (2019)

Works by Claire Cartier 
 Reluctantly Mrs. Darcy (2018)

Works by Amy Cecil 
 A Royal Disposition (2012)
 Relentless Considerations (2015)
 On Stranger Prides (2018)

Works by Katherine J. Chen 
 Mary B (2018)

Works by Nicole Clarkston 
 Rumours & Recklessness (2015)
 The Courtship of Edward Gardiner (2016)
 These Dreams (2017)
 London Holiday (2018)

Works by Debbie Cowens 
 Murder & Matchmaking (2015)

Works by Helene Curtis 
 A Scandal at Meryton (2017)
 Elizabeth Comes Undone (2017)
 A Netherfield Masquerade (2017)

Works by Amy D'Orazio
 The Best Part of Love (2016)
 A Short Period of Exquisite Felicity (2017)

Works by Maria Dashwood 

 Mr. Darcy Confesses His Love (2020)
 Mr. Darcy Proves His Love (2020)

Works by Andrea David 
 The Darcys' First Christmas: The Disappearance (2016)
 Darcy Comes to Rosings (2018)

Works by Campbell Davies 
 Fortunate Diversions (2017)
 Netherfield Proposal (2017)
 Darcy's Deception (2018)

Works by Amy Elizabeth Davis 
 Darcy Bites: Pride and Prejudice with Fangs (2015)

Works by Jane Dawkins 
 Letters from Pemberley: The First Year (1999)
 More Letters from Pemberley (2007)

Works by Becky Day 
 Passion Over Pemberley (2018)
 A Bargain with Mr. Darcy (2018)

Works by Sonali Dev 
 Pride, Prejudice, and Other Flavors (2019)

Works by L.L. Diamond
 Rain and Retribution (2013)
 A Matter of Chance (2013)
 An Unwavering Trust (2015)
 The Earl's Conquest (2015)
 Particular Intentions (2016)
 Particular Attachments (2017)
 Unwrapping Mr. Darcy (2018)
 It's Always Been You (2019)
 It's Always Been Us (2019)
 It's Always Been You and Me (2019)
 Undoing (2020)
 Confined with Mr. Darcy (2020)

Works by Adele Dixon 
 Shadow of Anubis (2017)
 By Hathor's Hand (2018)

Works by Emma Dow 
 A Merry Darcy Christmas (2017)

Works by Tish Elham 
 Summer's End (2018)

Works by Anna Elliott 
 Georgiana Darcy's Diary (2011)
 Pemberley to Waterloo (2011)
 Kitty Bennet's Diary (2014)

Work by Elizabeth Eulberg 

 Prom and Prejudice (2011)

Works by Philip José Farmer 
 Tarzan Alive! (1972) – "include[s] numerous nineteenth-century literary characters including Elizabeth Bennet and Fitzwilliam Darcy from Jane Austen's Pride & Prejudice, by means of an elaborate genealogical table."

Works by Helen Fielding
 Bridget Jones's Diary (1996)

Works by Terri Fleming 
 Perception (2017)

Works by Katherine Furman 

 Emoji Pride and Prejudice: Epic Tales in Tiny Texts (2016)

Works by Seth Grahame-Smith 
 Pride and Prejudice and Zombies (2009) – this work transposes the undead into Jane Austen's work, and is technically co-authored by Jane Austen

Works by Amanda Grange 
 Mr. Darcy's Diary (2007)
 Mr Darcy, Vampyre (2009)
 Dear Mr. Darcy (2012)

Works by Janice Hadlow
 The Other Bennet Sister

Works by Shannon Hale
 Austenland (2007) – deals with a woman obsessed with finding her own Mr. Darcy.

Works by Anna Harlow 
 No Eligible Gentleman (2018)

Works by Ann Herendeen
Pride/Prejudice - this revisionist " 2010 slash fiction" work imagines Darcy and Elizabeth as bisexuals, involved with Charles Bingley and Charlotte Lucas as their respective lovers.

Works by Steve Hockensmith 
 Pride and Prejudice and Zombies: Dawn of the Dreadfuls (2010)
 Pride and Prejudice and Zombies: Dreadfully Ever After (2011)

Works by Grace Hollister 
 Painting Mr. Darcy (2018)
 Seeing Mr. Darcy (2019)

Works by Jenetta James 
 Suddenly Mrs. Darcy (2015)
 The Elizabeth Papers (2016)
 Lover's Knot (2018)

Works by P. D. James
 Death Comes to Pemberley (2011)

Works by Paisley James 
 To Save and Protect (2018)
 To Love and Cherish (2018)

Works by Mixi Jane 
 Lizzie's Request (2017)
 Lizzie Expects (2017)
 Lizzie Delivers (2017)
 Darcy's Twin Daughters (2017)
 Lizzie's Lie (2017)

Works by Alyssa Jefferson 
 Mr. Darcy & Elizabeth: London in Love (2017)
 Mr. Darcy and Elizabeth: What Time Has Done (2018)
 What Hope Has Done (2018)

Works by Jane Jones and Lydia Lanor 
 Mr. Darcy's Spring Love (2017)
 Mr. Darcy in Paris (2017)

Works by Jennifer Joy 
 The Cousins Series
 Darcy's Ultimatum (2015)
 Anne's Adversity (2015)
 Colonel Fitzwilliam's Challenge (2015)
 Earning Darcy's Trust (2015)
 Accusing Elizabeth (2016)
 Win, Lose, or Darcy (2016)
 Love Never Fails (2016)
 The Elizabeth Conspiracy (2017)
 A Meryton Mystery Series
 The Honorable Mr Darcy (2016)
 The Indomitable Miss Elizabeth (2017)
 The Inseparable Mr. and Mrs. Darcy (2017)
 The Immovable Mr. Tanner (2018)
 Fitzwilliam Darcy, Traitor (2018_

Works by Soniah Kamal 
 Unmarriageable (2019)

Works by Olivia Kane 
 Elizabeth Bennet's Wedding (2018)

Works by April Karber 
 Fault or Virtue (2013)
 Beauty Slays the Beast (2014)
 A Curious Misunderstanding (2014)
 The Pride of Pemberley (2014)
 The Darcy Governess (2015)
 Tide and Prejudice (2017)
 Romancing Miss Bennet (2017)

Works by Jennifer Kay 
 Before a Fall (2017)
 Darcy's Tempest (2017)
 A Lady's Pride (2017)
 What Happened in Lambton (2018)

Works by Madeline Kennet 
 A Walk in Oakham Wood (2016)
 Fated to Meet (2016)
 Nothing but the Deepest Love (2016)
 The Light of Dawn (2016)
 Ribbons, Lace and Verse (2017)
 Lost in Love (2017)
 Feather in the Wind (2017)
 In My Heart (2017)
 What Comes Around (2018)

Works by Victoria Kincaid 
 The Secrets of Darcy and Elizabeth (2014)
 Pride and Proposals (2015)
 Mr. Darcy to the Rescue (2015)
 When Mary Met the Colonel (2016)
 Darcy vs Bennet (2016)
 Chaos Comes to Longbourn (2016)
 A Very Darcy Christmas (2016)
 Darcy's Honor (2017)
 President Darcy (2017)
 Christmas at Darcy House (2017)
 The Unforgettable Mr. Darcy (2018)

Works by J Dawn King 
 A Father's Sins (2014)
 Compromised! (2015)
 Love Letters from Mr Darcy (2016)
 The Abominable Mr Darcy (2016)
 Mr Darcy's Mail-Order Bride (2016)
 Yes, Mr. Darcy (2016)
 Friends and Enemies (2017)
 The Letter of the Law (2018)

Works by Sophia King 
 A More Gentlemanlike Manner (2017)
 From Admiration to Love (2017)

Works by Violet King 

 Mr. Darcy's Cipher (2018)
 An Unsuitable Governess (2019)
 Mr. Darcy's Seaside Romance (2019)
 Mr. Darcy's Missing Bride (2019)
 Mr. Darcy's Ruined Bride (2020)
 Mr. Darcy's Hunted Bride (2020)
 Mr. Darcy's Bennet (2020)
 Mr. Darcy's Assembly (2020)

Works by V.L. King 

 Darcy's Hidden Desire (2019)
 Mrs. Darcy's Masque Seduction (2019)
 Darcy's Stolen Rendezvous (2019)
 Darcy's Winter Delight (2020)

Works by Nora Kipling 
 Christmas at Netherfield (2016)
 Shadows Upon Netherfield (2017)
 A Required Engagement: Book 1 (2017)
 A Required Engagement: Book 2 (2017)
 A Required Engagement: Book 3 (2017)
 Much Ado About I Do (2017)
 Starcrossed at Longbourn (2017)

Works by S.M. Klassen 
 Mary, Mary, Not So Ordinary (2013)
 Mary, Mary, Oh So Contrary (2014)
 Mary, Mary, How Extraordinary (2015)
 Mayhem at the Minster (2016)

Works by Cassandra Knightley 
 Love Blooms at Pemberley (2017)
 Mischief & Misunderstanding (2017)
 Pemberley Duet (2017)

Works by Debra-Ann Kummoung 
 Falling for Elizabeth Bennet (2019)
 True Love Never Fails... (2019)
 Mr. Darcy's Christmas Surprise (2019)
 True Love Conquers All (2020)

Works by Krista Lakes 
 Mr. Darcy's Kiss (2017)

Works by Cressida Lane 
 Compromised (2017)
 Fitzwilliam Darcy, Earl of Matlock (2017)

Works by Sharon Lathan 
 Mr. and Mrs. Fitzwilliam Darcy: Two Shall Become One (2007)
 Loving Mr. Darcy: Journeys Beyond Pemberley (2009)
 My Dearest Mr. Darcy: An Amazing Journey into Love Everlasting (2010)
 In the Arms of Mr. Darcy (2010)
 The Trouble with Mr. Darcy (2011)
 Miss Darcy Falls in Love (2011)
 Darcy & Elizabeth: A Season of Courtship (2014)
 Darcy & Elizabeth: Hope of the Future (2017)

Works by Cassandra B Leigh 
 Pride in Meryton (2015)
 Steady to His Purpose (2015)
 Endeavor at Civility (2015)
 To Make You Love Me (2015)
 Proud Beaux Series
 Tempt You to Accept Me (2015)
 Worthy of Being Pleased (2016)
 Affectionate Hearts (2017)

Works by Lory Lilian 
 Rainy Days (2009)
 Remembrance of the Past (2011)
 His Uncle's Favorite (2013)
 The Perfect Match (2014)
 Sketching Mr. Darcy (2015)
 The Rainbow Promise (2016)
 A Man with Faults (2017)
 A Resentful Man (2017; included in The Darcy Monologues anthology)
 Ardently Loved (2018)
 Yearning For You (2018)
 Bitterness of Spirit (2018)

Works by Amelia Littlewood 
 Death at the Netherfield Park Ball (2017)
 The Mystery of the Indian Diadem (2017)
 The Peculiar Doctor Barnabus (2018)
 The Apparition at Rosing's Park (2018)
 The Shadow of Moriarty (2018)
 The Adventure of the King's Portrait (2018)
 The Case of the Patriarch (2018)
 The Final Equation (2018)

Works by Anne Louise 
 Suddenly Elizabeth (2016)
 Suddenly Mr. Darcy (2017)
 A Dangerous Courtship (2017)

Works by Joann Louise 
 Elizabeth Bennet - A Determined Woman (2013)
 I Hate You Mr. Darcy (2013)
 Murder at Rosings (2013)
 Elizabeth Bennet's Surprising Visit (2013)
 Elizabeth Bennet in Love (2014)
 Pemberley Roses (2014)
 Darcy's Resolve: Only Elizabeth Will Do (2014)
 Darcy and Elizabeth's Fortuitous Meeting (2018)

Works by Kara Louise 
 Master Under Good Regulation (2007)
 Pemberley's Promise (2010)
 Something Like Regret (2010)
 Darcy's Voyage (2010)
 Only Mr. Darcy Will Do (2011)
 Pemberley Celebrations - The First Year (2011)
 Pirates and Prejudice (2013)
 Mr. Darcy's Rival (2015)
 A Peculiar Engagement (2016)

Works by Sophie Lynbrook 
 Lady Anne and Lady Catherine (2016)
 Lizzy's Novel (2016)
 Did Darcy Do It? (2016)
 Mr. Darcy Dances (2017)
 An Odd Situation (2018)
 Wild Goose Chase (2018)
 Under the Harvest Moon (2018)
 An Intolerable Situation (2019)
 Much Ado About Many Things (2020)
 One More Time (2020)
 Cindereliza (2022)
 Mr. Darcy Falls on His Feet (2022)

Works by Wynne Mabry 
 More Than Admiration (2017)
 Imprisoned with Mr. Darcy (2017)
 Pride and Prejudice and Prudence (2017)
 Christmas in Derbyshire (2017)
 The Last Miss Bennet (2018)
 An Alternate Perspective (2019)

Works by KaraLynne Mackrory 
 Falling for Mr. Darcy (2012)
 Bluebells in the Mourning (2013)
 Haunting Mr. Darcy (2014)
 Yours Forevermore, Darcy (2015)
 Shades of Pemberley (2015; included in Sun-Kissed anthology)
 Clandestiny (2017; included in The Darcy Monologues anthology)
 Where the Sky Touches the Sea (2018; included in Rational Creatures anthology)
 BeSwitched (2020; novella)

Works by Charity McColl 
 The Pemberley Affair (2017)

Works by Judy McCrosky 
 Miss Bingley Requests (2016)

Works by Colleen McCullough
 The Independence of Miss Mary Bennet (2009)

Works by Octavia McKenzie 
 All Jane Austen's Men: The Journal, Poems & Love Letters of Mr. Darcy & All (2015)

Works by Renata McMann and Summer Hanford 
 The Second Mrs. Darcy (2014)
 Georgiana Folly (2014)
 Elizabeth's Plight (2014)
 Caroline and the Footman (2015)
 The Scandalous Stepmother (2015)
 Mr. Collins' Deception (2015)
 Mary Younge (2015)
 Poor Mr. Darcy (2015)
 A Death at Rosings (2015)
 Lady Catherine Regrets (2015)
 Entanglements of Honor (2016)
 From Ashes to Heiresses (2016)
 The Fire at Netherfield Park (2016)
 Courting Elizabeth (2016)
 Epiphany with Tea (2016)
 Miss Bingley's Christmas (2016)
 Her Final Wish (2017)
 Believing in Darcy (2017)
 Foiled Elopement (2017)
 The Widow Elizabeth (2017)
 The Forgiving Season (2018)
 Hypothetically Married (2018)
 The Long Road to Longbourn (2018)
 Love, Letters and Lies (2018)
 A Duel in Meryton (2019)
 After Anne (2020)
 More Than He Seems (2020)

Works by Sophia Meredith 
 On Oakham Mount (2016)
 Beyond Oakham Mount (2016)
 Miss Darcy's Companion (2016)

Works by Julia Middleton 
 In Want of a Wife (2017)

Works by Don H. Miller 
 An Unexpected Legacy (2013)
 An Extraordinary Request (2013)
 Mistakes and Misunderstandings (2013)
 Georgiana's Project (2014)
 The Resolute Suitor (2014)
 Elizabeth's Song (2014)
 Darcy's Second Chance (2015)
 Darcy and the Twins (2015)
 Remorse and Reconciliation (2016)
 The Angel of Grove Street (2016)
 The Sisters of Longbourn (2016)
 A Second Chance for Happiness (2017)
 Persistence Prevails (2017)
 Anything is Possible (2018)
 The Gazebo (2018)
 Mr. Bennet's Gambit (2018)

Works by Fenella J Miller 
 Miss Bennet & Mr Bingley (2009)

Works by Pamela Mingle 
 The Pursuit of Mary Bennet (2013)

Works by Demi Monde 
 Mr. Darcy is Diverted (2019)
 Darcy Interrupted (2019)
 Pemberley's Secret (2019)
 Mr. Darcy Rings My Bell (2019)
 Part 1 Mr. Darcy's Pursuit of Elizabeth Bennet (2020)
 Part 2 Mr. Darcy's Pursuit of Elizabeth Bennet (2020)
 Part 3 Mr. Darcy's Pursuit of Elizabeth Bennet (2020)
 Part 4 Mr. Darcy's Pursuit of Elizabeth Bennet (2020)
 Part 5 Mr. Darcy's Pursuit of Elizabeth Bennet (2020)
 Mr. Darcy's Pursuit of Elizabeth Bennet (complete story) (2020)
 5 Steamy Pride and Prejudice Variations (2020)

Works by Ginger Monette 
 Tree of Life: Charlotte & the Colonel (2014)
 Darcy's Hope: Beauty from Ashes (2016)
 Darcy's Hope: At Donwell Abbey (2017)

Works by Natalie Moore 
 Reunited With Mr. Darcy (2018)

Works by Christina Morland 
 A Remedy Against Sin (2016)
 This Disconcerting Happiness (2016)
 Seasons of Waiting (2018)

Works by Anne Morris 
 At Last (2018)
 The Nunnery (2018)
 All's Fair in Love and War and Death (2019)

Works by Diane H. Morris 
 Cousin Anne (2016)
 Rosings Park (2016)

Works by McKenzie Morris 
 A Chance Encounter (2018)

Works by Melissa Nathan
 Pride, Prejudice and Jasmin Field (2000) (Republished in 2008 under the title Acting Up)

Works by Vera Nazarian
 Pride and Platypus: Mr. Darcy's Dreadful Secret (2012)

Works by S J Nixon 
 The Darcy Madness (2014)

Works by Denise O'Hara 
 Life After the Wedding (2015)
 Love is in the Air (2015)
 Disdain and Deception (2015)
 Yours Truly, Mr. Darcy (2015)
 Darcy and Elizabeth: Timeless (2016)
 Darcy and Elizabeth's Timeless Adventures: London (2016)
 Complicated Attachments (2016)
 Legally Darcy (2016)
 Darcy and Elizabeth's Timeless Adventures: Titanic (2017)
 Mr. Fitzwilliam Darcy and the Scarlet Pimpernel (2017)

Works by Diana J. Oaks 
 One Thread Pulled: The Dance with Mr. Darcy (2013)

Works by Jane Odiwe 
 Lydia Bennet's Story (2008)
 Mr. Darcy's Secret (2011)

Works by Emma Osborne 
 The Rosings Bride (2017)
 Waking Up at Rosings (2017)
 Letters from Rosings (2017)
 Return to Rosings (2017)
 Angel of Waterloo: Jane Bennet: War Nurse (2017)
 Red Moon Over Meryton (2017)

Works by Meg Osborne 
 A Very Messy Masquerade (2016)
 The Collins Conundrum (2017)
 The Wickham Wager (2017)
 The Darcy Decision (2017)
 The Other Elizabeth Bennet (2017)
 Longbourn's Lark (2017)
 Three Weeks in Kent (2017)
 Suitably Wed (2017)
 Mr. Darcy's Christmas Carol (2017)
 A Visit to Scotland (2018)
 The Consequence of Haste (2018)
 A Surprise Engagement (2018)
 Such Peculiar Providence (2018)
 A Chance at Happiness (2018)
 The Colonel's Cousin (2018)
 Midwinter in Meryton (2018)
 A Sister's Fault (2019)
 A Friend's Betrayal (2019)

Works by Elaine Owen 
 Mr. Darcy's Persistent Pursuit (2014)
 Love's Fool: The Taming of Lydia Bennet (2014)
 One False Step (2015)
 Duty Demands (2017)

Works by Jennifer Paynter 
 The Forgotten Sister (2014)

Works by Rae Poynter 
Meryton High 2017 - a modern-day adaptation set in a US high school

Works by Rebecca Preston 
 Arranged To Darcy (2017)
 A Convenient Darcy Marriage (2018)
 Married To Darcy (2018)
 Elizabeth and Darcy: A Romeo & Juliet Twist (2018)
 Mr. Darcy Forgotten (2019)

Works by Sarah Price 
 First Impressions: An Amish Tale of Pride and Prejudice (2014)

Works by Melanie Rachel 
 Drawing Mr. Darcy: Book One (2018)
 Drawing Mr. Darcy: Book Two (2018)

Works by Jaeza Rayleigh 
 Smoky Dreams (2018)

Works by Jennifer Redlarczyk 
 A Very Merry Mix-up (2018)
 Darcy's Melody (2018)

Works by Abigail Reynolds
 Impulse and Initiative (2008); republished in mass market paperback as To Conquer Mr. Darcy (2010)
 Pemberley by the Sea (2008); republished in mass market paperback as The Man Who Loved Pride & Prejudice (2010)
 Mr Fitzwilliam Darcy: The Last Man in the World (2010); originally self-published as The Last Man in the World (2007)
 Mr. Darcy's Obsession (2010)
 What Would Mr. Darcy Do? (2011); originally self-published as From Lambton to Longbourn (2007)
 Mr. Darcy's Undoing (2011); originally self-published as Without Reserve (2007)
 By Force of Instinct (2007, 2011)
 A Pemberley Medley (2011)
 Mr. Darcy's Letter (2011)
 Mr. Darcy's Refuge (2012)
 Mr. Darcy's Noble Connections (2013)
 The Darcys of Derbyshire (2013)
 Alone with Mr Darcy (2015)
 Mr Darcy's Journey (2016)
 Conceit & Concealment (2017)
 Mr. Darcy's Enchantment (2018)
 A Matter of Honor (2019)
 The Price of Pride (2020)

Work by Heather Lynn Rigaud 

 Fitzwilliam Darcy, Rock Star (2011)

Works by Darcie Rochester 
 The Ruin of Elizabeth Bennet (2018)

Works by Atlee Rose 
 The Truth About Mr. Wickham (2017)
 A Most Alarming Report (2019)

Works by Emily Russell 
 Longbourn's Distinguished Guest (2017)
 Disruption at Pemberley (2018)
 Through Pemberley Woods (2018)
 Follies and Vices (2019)
 Trapped at Rosings (2019)
 An Encounter at Brighton (2020)
 Partial and Prejudiced (2021)

Works by M.A. Sandiford 
 Darcy's Highland Fling (2018)

Works by Patrice Sarath 
 The Unexpected Miss Bennet (2011)

Works by Angela Schroeder 
 A Lie Universally Hidden (2017)
 The Goodness of Men (2017)

Works by Marion Selby 
 Marriage Against All Odds (2019)

Works by Jemima Selkirk 
 An Old Friend (2018)
 The Pemberley House Party (2018)

Works by L. J. Shaw 
 Initial Impressions (2022)

Works by Sophia Sheppard 
 From Peril to Joy (2018)

Works by Curtis Sittenfeld
 Eligible (2016)

Works by Wendy Soliman 
 Miss Bingley's Revenge (2018)
 Colonel Fitzwilliam's Dilemma (2018)
 Miss Darcy's Passion (2018)
 Kitty Bennet's Despair (2018)
 Lydia Wickham's Journal (2018)
 Emma Bingley's Romantic Nature (2018)
 Naomi Sanford's Compassionate Nature (2018)
 Bella Darcy's Impetuous Nature (2018)
 Eleanor Bingley's Rebellious Nature (2018)
 Rosie Turner's Contrary Nature (2018)
 Susie Darcy's Tenacious Nature (2018)

Works by Wendy Sotis 
 Promises (2011)
 Dreams and Expectations (2012)
 The Keys for Love (2014)
 A Lesson Hard Learned (2016)

Works by Kate Speck 
 Lessons in Gratitude (2017)
 Service of a Friend (2017)
 Resolution and Determination (2017)
 The Proud and the Beast (2017)
 Clues to a Mystery (2018)
 First Impressions of a Second Nature (2018)
 Growing Pains (2018)
 Growing Pains Too (2018)
 Teachings of His Father (2018)
 November Twenty-Seventh (2018)
 Murders in London (2018)
 The Next Mr. Darcy (2018)
 The Adventures of Lizzy Bennet: Book 1 (2019)
 The Adventures of Lizzy Bennet: Book 2 (2019)
 The Adventures of Lizzy Bennet: Book 3 (2019)
 Rank and Circumstance (2019)
 Love in the Afternoon (2019)
 50 First Impressions (2019)
 The Diary (2019)
 Mr. Darcy's Deception (2020)
 Elizabeth's Deception (2020)
 The Curse (2020)
 The Key (2021)
 Amelia Rose By Any Other Name (2021)

Works by Rosalie Stanton 
 A Higher Education (2018)

Works by Joana Starnes 
 The Subsequent Proposal (2013)
 The Second Chance (2014)
 The Falmouth Connection (2014)
 The Unthinkable Triangle (2015)
 Miss Darcy's Companion (2016)
 Mr. Bennet's Dutiful Daughter (2016)
 If Only a Dream (2017; included in The Darcy Monologues anthology)
 The Darcy Legacy (2018)

Works by Sophie Starnes 
 The Easter Gloves (2017)

Works by Jacqueline Steel 
 An Unlikely Hero, An Unlikely Love (2017)
 A Heroes Guilt for Mr. Darcy (2017)

Works by Amy Street 
 Becoming Mary (2014)

Works by Bernie Su and Kate Rorick
 The Secret Diary of Lizzie Bennet: A Novel (Lizzie Bennet Diaries) 2014
 The Epic Adventures of Lydia Bennet: A Novel (Lizzie Bennet Diaries) 2015

Works by Anna Kate Suton 
 Desperate Hearts (2016)

Works by Elizabeth Sylvester 
 First Comes Marriage (2018)

Works by Anne M Tait 
 Darcy's Unconventional Proposal (2018)

Works by Emma Tennant
 Pemberley: Or Pride & Prejudice Continued (1993)
 An Unequal Marriage: Or Pride and Prejudice Twenty Years Later (1994)

Works by Gianna Thomas 
 Attending a Ball (2014)
 Darcy Chooses (2014-2015)
 Darcy Vs Bingley (2017)
 The Women of Longbourn (2017)
 Elizabeth's Choice (2018)
 Darcy Vs Lady Catherine (2018)

Works by Sophie Turner 
 A Constant Love (2015)
 Less Proud and More Persuasive (2015)
 A Change of Legacies (2016)
 Mistress (2017)

Works by Wayne Tyson 
 Pride and Perpetration (2017)
 The Legend of the Map (2020)
 The Four Horsemen of the Acropolis (2021)

Works by Timothy Underwood 
 The Return (2015)
 Mr. Darcy's Vow (2016)
 A Dishonorable Offer (2016)
 Colonel Darcy (2016)
 The Trials (2017)

Works by Gizele Vezelay 
 The Forgotten Bonnet (2018)
 How to Rescue a Lady (2018)

Works by Brenda J. Webb 
 Mr. Darcy's Forbidden Love (2012)
 Fitzwilliam Darcy: An Honourable Man (2014)
 Darcy and Elizabeth: A Most Unlikely Couple (2014)
 Darcy and Elizabeth: A Promise Kept (2016)
 Passages: A Pemberley Tale (2016)
 A Twist of Fate (2017)
 Proof of Love: A Pemberley Tale (2018)

Works by Elizabeth Ann Westelizabethannwest.com 
 The Trouble with Horses (2014)
 A Winter Wrong: Book 1 of the Seasons of Serendipity (2014)
 A Spring Sentiment: Book 2 of the Seasons of Serendipity (2014)
 A Summer Shame: Book 3 of the Seasons of Serendipity (2014)
 By Consequence of Marriage: Book 1 of the Moralities of Marriage (2014)
 Very Merry Mischief (2014/2015)
 An Autumn Accord: Book 4 of the Seasons of Serendipity (2015)
 A Virtue of Marriage: Book 2 of the Moralities of Marriage (2015)
 A Winter Wonder: Book 5 of the Seasons of Serendipity (2015)
 The Blessing of Marriage: Book 3 of the Moralities of Marriage (2016)
 To Capture Mr. Darcy (2016)
 A January for Jane: A Season of Serendipity Bride (2016)
 The Whisky Wedding (2016)
 The Trappings of Marriage: Book 4 of the Moralities of Marriage (2017)
 If Mr. Darcy Dared (2018)
 A Spring Society: Book 6 of the Seasons of Serendipity (2019)
 A May for Mary: A Season of Serendipity Bride (2019)
 The Miracle of Marriage: Book 5 of the Moralities of Marriage (2019)
 Mr. Darcy's Twelfth Night (2021)
 A Test of Fire (2021)
 Happy Was the Day (2022)
 For the Love of a Bennet (2022)

Works by Lin Mei Wei 
 Mr. Darcy's Vice (2018)
 Stranded with Mr. Darcy (2018)
 The Unreformed Mr. Darcy (2018)

Works by Carolyn Whyte 
 The Longbourn Will (2015)
 Darcy's Denial (2015)
 Darcy's Deliverance (2016)

Works by Caitlin Williams 
 Ardently (2015)
 The Coming of Age of Elizabeth Bennet (2016)
 When We Are Married (2017)
 Death of a Bachelor (2017; included in The Darcy Monologues anthology)
 The Events at Branxbourne (2018)

Works by Enid Wilson 
 Really Angelic (2010)
 Fire and Cross (2010)
 My Darcy Mutates... (2010)
 Bargain with the Devil (2011)
 Every Savage Can Reproduce (2011)
 The Spinster's Vow (2011)
 My Darcy Vibrates... (2011)
 The Angel Sees Grey (2013)
 Prince Darcy's Private Eye (2013)
 Headstrong Girls (2013), with June Williams and Debra Anne Watson
 My Darcy Pulsates... (2013)
 My Darcy Exhilarates... (2014)
 Sketching His Character (2015)
 Darcy's Theta Magic (2015)
 Outwitting Mr Darcy (2019)
 The Truth about the Merry Widow (2019)
 Mr Darcy's Chilling Proposal (2020)
 Deepest Desires, Deadliest Hate (2020)
 Time to Forgive Life (2020)
 Happiness in Marriage (2021), with Margot Spencer

Works by Abby Wilton 
 Kitty (2018)

Works by Gemma Wilton 
 Marry My Daughter Already! (2018)

Works by Shannon Winslow 
 The Darcys of Pemberley (2011)
 Return to Longbourn (2013)
 Miss Georgiana Darcy of Pemberley (2015)
 The Ladies of Rosings Park (2018)

Works by Sophia Woodford 
 Mr. Darcy Plays His Part (2018)

Works by Isabelle Woodward 
 A Sensual Retelling (2015)
 Pride and Prejudice: The Tale Continues (2016)
 The Netherfield Three (2017)
 Loving Mr. Bingley (2017)
 Charlotte's Tale (2018)

Works by Ibi Zoboi 
 Pride (2018)

Works by Harriet Knowles 
 Mr. Darcy’s Baby (2016)
 Mr. Darcy’s Bride (2016)
 Compromise and Obligation (2017)
 Her Very Own Mr. Darcy (2017)
 Hidden in Plain Sight (2017)
 Love Changes Everything (2017)
 Mr. Darcy's Stolen Love (2017)
 The Darcy Bennet Arrangement (2017)
 The Darcy Plot (2017)
 A Life Apart (2018)
 Tug of Love (2018)
 A Rare Ability (2019)
 Darcy, the Admiral (2019)
 Darcy, the Duke (2019)
 Darcy, the Investigator (2019)
 Darcy’s Change of Heart (2019)
 Imagining Mr. Darcy (2019)
 No Ordinary Life (2019)
 The Wrong Brother (2019)
 A Pemberley Wonderland (2020)
 Married for Revenge (2020)
 Tall, Dark and Darcy (2020)
 The Lost Heir (2020)
 A More Gentlemanlike Manner (2021)
 As a Moth to the Flame (2021)
 Fighting Fate (2021)

Works by Harriet Knowles and Georgina Peel 
 Forever, Darcy (2018)
 Impatiently, Darcy (2018)
 Proudly, Darcy (2018)
 Urgently, Darcy (2018)

Works by Georgina Peel 
 The Secret Mrs. Darcy (2019)

Music

The band Glass Wave included a song about Elizabeth Bennet's mother on their 2010 album.  In the song, entitled "Mrs. Bennet," Elizabeth's mother claims to be the mother of all mothers.

See also
Jane Austen in popular culture
Jane Austen's filmography
Jane Austen fan fiction

References

Lists of books based on novels
Sequel novels
 
Fan fiction works